Odd and the Frost Giants (2008) is a World Book Day book by Neil Gaiman. It draws on Norse mythology and also the historical Vikings.

Plot summary 
Odd is a young Norseman whose father, a woodcutter, drowned during a Viking raid. Soon after he accidentally crushes his leg and his Scottish mother marries a fat widower who neglects him in favor of his own children, and when soon after the winter drags on unnaturally long, Odd leaves his village for the forest. There he meets a fox, an eagle and a bear, the latter with its paw trapped in a tree. Odd aids the bear, and tries to feed him. The bear accepted and was actually hungry. Therefore Odd would always feed him. But as time passed by, he learns that these are not normal animals, but the gods Loki, Odin and Thor. The gods have been transformed and cast out of Asgard by a Frost Giant who tricked Loki into giving him Thor's hammer by taking the form of a woman, granting him rule over Asgard and causing the endless winter. But wherether they were gods or not, Odd couldn't continue to feed them. But he realises that the gods had nowhere to go and couldn't feed themselves.

Deciding to help the stranded gods, Odd travels with them to Asgard. There, Thor leads him to Mimir's Well, and he receives wisdom and a vision of his parents in their youth. He eventually speaks with the Giant, who reveals his brother built the walls of Asgard but was tricked out of payment and killed by Thor. Odd convinces the Giant to return home. In return, the goddess Freya heals his leg, though she cannot mend it completely, and Odin gives him a staff. He returns to Midgard, somewhat bigger than when he left due to drinking from Mimir's Well, and as the winter ends he reunites with his mother.

Reception 
Kirkus Reviews gave Odd and the Frost Giants a starred review and called it a "sweet, wistful, slyly funny novella". In their review, they compare the book to George R.R. Martin's The Ice Dragon, saying the book functions both as a children's book and as a collectible for adults. Publishers Weekly wrote the story would be enjoyed by children, but called it simple and "less original" than some of Gaiman's previous works Coraline and The Wolves in the Walls.

Ian Chipman, for The Booklist, praised Gaiman's "deft humor, lively prose, and agile imagination" and noted the book would have special appeal to children interested in Norse mythology. A review published on The Horn Book Magazine called Gaiman's writing "impeccable", and noted the humor present throughout the story. The reviewer also praised Helquist's illustrations, saying they "deftly evoke Gaiman's wintry Norse world."

References

External links
 Author's page for the book
 Publisher's page for the book

2008 British novels
2008 fantasy novels
British children's novels
British fantasy novels
Children's historical novels
Novels by Neil Gaiman
Novels set in the Viking Age
2008 children's books
Norse mythology in art and literature
Bloomsbury Publishing books